The 1964–65 Iowa Hawkeyes men's basketball team represented the University of Iowa in intercollegiate basketball during the 1964–65 season. The team was led by first-year head coach Ralph Miller and played their home games at the Iowa Field House. The Hawkeyes finished the season 14–10 and were 8–6 in Big Ten conference games.

The team was 3–2 in games versus opponents ranked in the AP top five, including a neutral site win over No. 1 UCLA, the eventual national champion.

Roster

Schedule/results

|-
!colspan=9 style=| Non-Conference Regular Season

|-
!colspan=9 style=| Big Ten Regular Season

Rankings

References

Iowa Hawkeyes men's basketball seasons
Iowa
Hawkeyes
Hawkeyes